I Was Looking at the Ceiling and Then I Saw the Sky is a 1995 "song play" with music composed by John Adams and a libretto by June Jordan.

Summary
The story takes place in the aftermath of the 1994 earthquake in Los Angeles, and covers the reactions of all characters to the event.

The main characters are seven young Americans all living in Los Angeles but from different social and ethnic backgrounds.

Style
According to the composer, the all song and ensemble piece is "a Broadwaystyle show" fused with gospel, pop ballad, the blues, doo-wop and popular song.

See also
 Contemporary opera
 Minimalism (music)
 Culture of Los Angeles

References

External links
 John Adams' official website - audio sample (title piece)
 Naxos
 Chandos

Operas by John Adams (composer)
English-language operas
1995 operas
Operas
Operas set in the United States
Los Angeles in fiction
Fiction set in 1994
Operas set in the 20th century